Mogamat Tawfeeq Salie (born 21 July 1991 in Cape Town, Western Cape) is a South African football (soccer) goalkeeper who currently plays for National First Division club All Stars.

References

External links
Tawfeeq Salie at Footballdatabase

1991 births
South African soccer players
Association football goalkeepers
Living people
Cape Town Spurs F.C. players
Sportspeople from Cape Town
Vasco da Gama (South Africa) players
Maritzburg United F.C. players
South African people of Malay descent
South African Muslims